Andrew N. Chalmers (born December 21, 1992) is a Canadian former teen actor.

Chalmers was born in Toronto, Ontario, Canada. From 2003 to 2006, he played at least 15 roles in both television and feature films. His acting has progressed clearly from minor roles to playing the lead as the voice of Harry in the television series Harry and His Bucket Full of Dinosaurs. Chalmers is also in Chicks with Sticks and the television series Darcy's Wild Life on Disney's ABC Family Channel, where he plays Jack Adams.

Filmography

Television 
 Darcy's Wild Life (2004–2006) – Jack Adams
 Harry and His Bucket Full of Dinosaurs (2005) – Harry
 A Very Married Christmas (2004) – Gabe
 Mutant X (2003) – Young Jonny

Film 
 Finn's Girl (2007) – Max
 Molly: An American Girl on the Home Front (2006) (TV) – Richard 'Ricky' McIntire
 Siblings (2004) – Pete
 Pigeon (2004) – Stray Kid #2
 A Home at the End of the World (2004) – Young Bobby Morrow (1967)
 Godsend (2004) – a St. Pius Student
 Chicks with Sticks (2004) – Stewart "Stewie" Taymore
 Comfort and Joy (2003) (TV) – Troy Keller and Ryan Chalmers

Awards
In 2006 & again in 2007, Andrew and his young co-stars from Darcy's Wild Life were nominated for the Young Artist Award in the category "Best Young Ensemble Performance in a TV Series" (Comedy or Drama).

References

External links
 

1992 births
Canadian male child actors
Canadian male film actors
Canadian male television actors
Canadian male voice actors
Living people
Male actors from Toronto